Hemiphyllodactylus longlingensis, also known as the Longling slender gecko, Longling gypsy gecko, or Longling dwarf gecko, is a species of gecko. It is found in China (Yunnan). It is named after its type locality, Longling.

References

Hemiphyllodactylus
Reptiles of China
Endemic fauna of Yunnan
Reptiles described in 1981